Red Production Company is a British independent television production company owned by StudioCanal.

Background 
Red Production Company was formed in 1998 by Nicola Shindler, a television producer who had worked on Our Friends in the North and Cracker. Based at MediaCityUK in Manchester in the north of England, Red's first production was the controversial drama Queer as Folk, written by Russell T Davies and based on the lives of three gay men in the city. This was screened on Channel 4 in early 1999 and drew much comment and praise.

The same year, Red followed this up with another series for Channel 4, an anthology of six half-hour plays about love entitled Love in the 21st Century. Queer as Folk 2 arrived in 2000, and since then Red has expanded to produce dramas for nearly all of the main British television channels. The company's success led to an attempt by Granada Television – in whose Quay Street building the company rented offices – to buy it, but Shindler turned down their offer, wanting to retain control of her own company.

In 2013, Red moved into the MediaCityUK complex in Manchester.

Partnerships 
In December 2013, it was announced that Shindler had sold a majority stake in Red to the French media company StudioCanal.

In 2015, it was announced that Shindler would provide creative guidance and management oversight to a new production company called Guilty Party, founded by the actor Simon Bird, Jonny Sweet, and Spencer Millman.

In 2016, Shindler went into business with author Harlan Coben to form the US-based production company, Final Twist Productions. Shindler is Co-CEO with Coben. StudioCanal will provide distribution services.

Programmes

For BBC One
 Clocking Off (2000–03)
 Linda Green (2001–02)
 Sparkhouse (2002)
 The Good Housekeeping Guide (2006)
 Magnolia (2006)
 New Street Law (2006–07)
 Single Father (2010)
 Last Tango in Halifax (2012–2020)
 The Driver (2014)
 Happy Valley (2014–23)
 Ordinary Lies (2015–16)
 Danny and the Human Zoo (2015)
 Trust Me (2017)
 Come Home (2018)
  Years and Years (2019)

For BBC Two
 Flesh and Blood (2002)
 Indian Dream (2003)

For BBC Choice
 Having It Off (2002)

For BBC Three
Burn It (2003)
Casanova (2005)
Conviction (2004)

For ITV
Bob & Rose (2001)
The Second Coming (2003)
Mine All Mine (2004)
Big Dippers (2005)
Dead Man Weds (2005)
Jane Hall (2006)
Unforgiven (2009)
Scott & Bailey (2011–16)
Prey (2014–15)
Paranoid (2016)
Butterfly (2018)
Finding Alice (2021)

For Channel 4
 Queer as Folk (1999–2000)
 Love in the 21st Century (1999)
 Legless (2005)
 The Mark of Cain (2007)
 Cucumber (2015)
 It's a Sin (2021)
For E4
 Banana (2015)

For Sky One
Now You See Her (2001)

For Sky Atlantic
Hit & Miss (2011)

For Netflix
Paranoid (2016)
Safe (2018)
The Stranger (2020)
Stay Close (2021)

For Amazon Prime Video
Anansi Boys (TBA)

References

External links
 

Television production companies of the United Kingdom
StudioCanal
Companies based in Manchester
Mass media companies established in 1998
British companies established in 1998
British subsidiaries of foreign companies